(born March 28, 1967) is a retired Japanese professional wrestler and mixed martial artist.

Professional wrestling career

Universal Wrestling Federation and New Japan Pro-Wrestling (1985–1988)
A former practitioner of judo, sumo and muay thai, Anjo tried professional wrestling after meeting Nobuhiko Takada. He passed the original Universal Wrestling Federation's entrance tests and had his debut on July 6, 1985, against Osamu Hoshina. He only wrestled a handful of matches for the company, as it collapsed later in the year and its roster moved back to New Japan Pro-Wrestling, where Anjo debuted as a low-ranking member of the UWF "invading" army. Often teaming with fellow shooter Tatsuo Nakano, he feuded with names like Akira Nogami, Osamu Matsuda and Masakatsu Funaki as part of the NJPW junior heavyweight division. He eventually left the company in 1988 following Takada, Akira Maeda and the rest of his crew to form the second incarnation of UWF.

UWF Newborn (1988–1990)
In 1988, already in UWF Newborn, Anjo climbed up the card and adopted a more eccentric image for himself, wearing zebra tights and bondage gear and using heelish sneaky tactics in the ring. He participated in a different style fight at the U-COSMOS event against Changpuek Kiatsongrit, and also wrestled Holland exponent Dick Vrij. Just before the promotion disgregated in several companies, Anjo got a high level victory against Minoru Suzuki.

Union of Wrestling Forces International (1991–1996)
In 1991 he joined UWF International, following his mentor Takada, and had success as the top native heel. He feuded with Takada and Kazuo Yamazaki, and had also an humbling match with The Iron Sheik.

In December 1994, Anjo was involved in a famous incident with Brazilian jiu-jitsu master Rickson Gracie. After Gracie declined to work with UWF International, Yoji travelled to California along with executive Shinji Sasazaki and a huge Japanese press contingent to perform a dojo challenge on Rickson. However, he lost the subsequent fight, with Rickson dominating him with brutal ground and pound and choking him out after the Japanese refused to give up.

With the UWFi's formerly fearsome reputation in tatters, the bookers had the idea of co-promoting events with NJPW in 1995, and Yoji earned a victory over Masahiro Chono in an interpromotional match. He and young wrestlers Yoshihiro Takayama and Kenichi Yamamoto formed a stable called the "Golden Cups" (a reference to pop rock band The Golden Cups) to feud in tag team and six-man matches against Super Strong Machine as the masked "200% Machines". They also forayed into WAR to feud with Genichiro Tenryu and others.

On August 17, 1996, Takada defeated Yoji Anjo at Tokyo's Meiji-Jingu Stadium.
Despite the effort, UWF's attendance numbers swiftly decreased, with the federation closing its doors once and for all in December 1996. In their final show it was Kazushi Sakuraba who at long last headlined, defeating Anjo by submission. Following UWFI's collapse he joined Kingdom but then wandered into independent promotions and also began competing in MMA matches.

All Japan Pro Wrestling (2000–2003)

In 2000 Anjo returned to professional wrestling to help out All Japan Pro Wrestling's rebuilding. He appeared as a partner to old foe Genichiro Tenryu, winning the World Tag Team Championship from Johnny Smith and Taiyo Kea. They retained the titles for a long times, including a double title match with AJPW All Asia Tag Team Champions Arashi and Koki Kitahara, against the teams of George Hines and Johnny Smith and Toshiaki Kawada and Nobutaka Araya, coming victorious after Anjo pinned Araya with a knee strike. After some weeks, Tenryu and Anjo finally lost the title to Keiji Mutoh and Taiyo Kea, dissolving the team.

After some single ventures and a failed team with Mitsuya Nagai, he quit All Japan and wandered again, joining Fighting World of Japan Pro Wrestling. He fought again alongside Tenryu, feuding with Takao Omori, and also teamed up with Ichiro Yaguchi to take part in the WMG Tag Team Championship tournament, but they were eliminated by Jinsei Shinzaki and Shiro Koshinaka.

Hustle (2004–2009)
After many months of inactivity, Anjo resurfaced in the sports entertainment promotion Hustle run by old comrade Takada. He debuted as Commander An Jo, Generalissimo Takada's right hand, wearing military uniforms and ornated eye masks.

On March 19, 2015, Anjo retired from professional wrestling, putting on a small interpromotional card called Y.A. is Dead (a reference to his entrance song James Brown Is Dead by LA Style) where he reformed his "Golden Cups" stable with Takayama and Yamamoto, to take on former UWF and New Japan foes Masakatsu Funaki, Minoru Suzuki and Sanae Kikuta in a best-of-three-falls six-man match. Anjo was forced to submit by Funaki in two straight falls, but Anjo demanded the match go to a third fall and was pinned by Suzuki.

Mixed martial arts career
Yoji's first shootfight was in UWF Newborn, after offering himself to fight muay thai champion Changpuek Kiatsongrit in the 1989 event U-Cosmos. Under mixed rules, Changpuek chose to wear gloves while Anjo did not. Started the fight, Yoji immediately clinched Changpuek to avoid his striking and repeatedly tried to take him down, but the Thai fighter kept holding the ring ropes in order to avoid it. After rounds, they traded kicks and Yoji cornered him in the turnbuckle several times, with Kiatsongrit never releasing the ropes. The Japanese wrestler managed to threaten him with submissions at the final round, but he couldn't lock them due to the rope escape rule, so the fight ended in a draw.

He had his official MMA debut at U-Japan, facing famed grappler Sean Alvarez in a half-hour losing effort.

Ultimate Fighting Championship
In 1997, he took part in Ultimate Fighting Championship's UFC Japan tournament representing Kingdom along with Kazushi Sakuraba, and was pitted against the much bigger and experienced David "Tank" Abbott. The American took advantage of his own wrestling superiority to take Anjo down repeatedly and use ground and pound, while Yoji answered with multiple submission attempts and leg kicks whenever he could. At the end of the fight, judges gave the decision to Abbot for keeping control during the fight. However, he had got a hand injury and had to retire from the tournament. Anjo's partner Sakuraba ended winning the tournament instead.

At the second UFC event in Japan, UFC 25, Anjo fought an even more dangerous grappler, Murilo Bustamante, considered one of the best in the world. The Japanese wrestler was immediately taken down and mounted, but he managed to perform a rolling reversal off the cage and fend off an armbar attempt, and for a time seemed to have secured a guillotine choke, but only briefly. At the second round, Anjo was taken down and submitted with an arm triangle choke. Anjo kept facing high level opponents in the form of Olympic wrestler Matt Lindland, in UFC 29. This time was Anjo the first in initiating the takedown, but Lindland used the fence to avoid it and maneuver to mount, from where he executed intense ground and pound until the referee stopped the fight.

PRIDE
Three years after getting a draw with Seikendo fighter Gia Chirragishvili in Deep, Anjo was invited to Pride Fighting Championships to fight Ryan Gracie, in remembrance of Anjo's past challenge to Rickson. The young Brazilian took Anjo down, but couldn't get the choke, and even shoved the referee away after the restart, earning a yellow card. Again Ryan got a takedown and gained half guard, taking Anjo's back, but Yoji defended it and they struggled for position until he fell in an armbar and had to tap out. This was Anjo's last MMA fight, although he still helped to train fighters like Daiju Takase and Kenichi Yamamoto.

Championships and accomplishments
All Japan Pro Wrestling
World Tag Team Championship (1 time) with Genichiro Tenryu
Wrestling Association R
WAR World Six-Man Tag Team Championship (2 times) with Yoshihiro Takayama and Kenichi Yamamoto; with Hiromichi Fuyuki and Bam Bam Bigelow
Tokyo Pro Wrestling
TWA Tag Team Championship (1 time) - with Original Tiger Mask
Tokyo Sports
Technique Award (1995)

Mixed martial arts record

|-
| Loss
| align=center| 0–5–1
| Ryan Gracie
| Submission (armbar)
| Pride Shockwave 2004
| 
| align=center| 1
| align=center| 8:33
| Saitama, Japan
| 
|-
| Draw
| align=center| 0–4–1
| Gia Chirragishvili
| Draw
| Deep - 1st Impact
| 
| align=center| 3
| align=center| 5:00
| Nagoya, Japan
| 
|-
| Loss
| align=center| 0–4
| Matt Lindland
| TKO (strikes)
| UFC 29
| 
| align=center| 1
| align=center| 2:58
| Tokyo, Japan
| 
|-
| Loss
| align=center| 0–3
| Murilo Bustamante
| Submission (arm triangle choke)
| UFC 25
| 
| align=center| 2
| align=center| 0:31
| Tokyo, Japan
| 
|-
| Loss
| align=center| 0–2
| David Abbott
| Decision
| UFC Japan
| 
| align=center| 1
| align=center| 15:00
| Yokohama, Japan
| 
|-
| Loss
| align=center| 0–1
| Sean Alvarez
| Submission (punches)
| U - Japan
| 
| align=center| 1
| align=center| 34:26
| Japan
|

Mixed rules 

| Draw
|align=center| 0–0–1
| Changpuek Kiatsongrit
| Draw
| UWF U-Cosmos
| 
|align=center| 5
|align=center| 3:00
| Tokyo, Japan
| 
|-

Kickboxing record

|-
|
|Loss
|align=left| Issei Nakai
|K-1 Spirits 1999
|Tokyo, Japan
|KO (punch)
|2
|1:22
|1–2–2
|-
|
|Win
|align=left| Tommy Glanville
|K-1 Survival 1999
|Tokyo, Japan
|KO (mid kick)
|2
|2:46
|1–1–2
|-
|
|Draw
|align=left| Duncan James
|K-1 The Challenge 1999
|Tokyo, Japan
|Decision Draw
|5
|3:00
|0–1–2
|-
|
|Loss
|align=left| Masaaki Satake
|K-1 Japan Grand Prix '98
|Tokyo, Japan
|TKO (high kick)
|2
|1:02
|0–1–1
|-
|
|Draw
|align=left| Manson Gibson
|Shoot boxing "Carnival Ground Zero Yokohama"
|Tokyo, Japan
|Decision Draw
|1
|20:00
|0–0–1
|-
| colspan=9 | Legend:

References

External links

1967 births
People from Suginami
Living people
Japanese male mixed martial artists
Japanese male professional wrestlers
Japanese male kickboxers
Japanese catch wrestlers
Light heavyweight mixed martial artists
Mixed martial artists utilizing catch wrestling
Mixed martial artists utilizing Muay Thai
Mixed martial artists utilizing Sumo
Sportspeople from Tokyo
Ultimate Fighting Championship male fighters
World Tag Team Champions (AJPW)
Tenryu Project World 6-Man Tag Team Champions
20th-century professional wrestlers
21st-century professional wrestlers